Pina de Montalgrao, or simply Pina, is a municipality in the comarca of Alto Palancia, Castellón, Valencia, Spain. According to the 2010 census the municipality has a population of 148 inhabitants.

This town is located in the mountainous Sistema Ibérico area.

Notable people
 Bertolí, former footballer

See also
Sierra de Javalambre
Alto Palancia

References

External links

Pina official site

Municipalities in the Province of Castellón
Alto Palancia